The Sexten Dolomites is a mountain range and a nature reserve in South Tyrol, Italy. The nature park was renamed in 2010 to Parco Naturale Tre Cime.

Peaks

References

External links 

 Civic network of South Tyrol

 
Mountain ranges of South Tyrol
Mountain ranges of the Alps